In 2019, at the age of 24, Raylance Mesa was the youngest winner of the Westpac Outstanding Woman Award (WOW) in Papua New Guinea (PNG) for her work to help her island to adapt to climate change.

Early life
Raylance Mesa comes from the Tami Islands, which are off Finschhafen on the Huon Peninsula in the Morobe Province of Papua New Guinea. She attained a bachelor's degree with merit in Architecture at the Papua New Guinea University of Technology (Unitech), in PNG's second city of Lae, between 2014 and 2018.

The island that Mesa comes from is sinking as a result of climate change, with differences in sea levels clearly noticeable. She started to work with her community to make changes at the age of 16. Building sea walls to protect buildings at risk of being swamped by the sea by using materials such as dead coral and tree trunks, she also organized fundraising to upgrade the island's school and to buy land on the mainland for occupation by the islanders when the sea does eventually reclaim their island.

Career
Since 2019, Mesa has been employed as a Graduate Architect by ExxonMobil in PNG's capital, Port Moresby.

Awards and honours
2019. Westpac Outstanding Woman for 2019 and Institute of Banking Business Management (IBBM) Young Achiever's Award.
2018. United Nations Youth Development Award. Mesa participated at the United Nations Economic and Social Council Youth Forum.
2017. Mesa was funded by the Kokoda Track Foundation's Archer Leaders Development Program. One of 8 final-year students chosen, she benefited from mentoring, work experience placements in New South Wales, Australia and PNG, and support for tuition fees.  
2017. Commonwealth Youth Award for excellence in development work.

References

External links
 Mesa discusses the work that led to her WOW awards

Year of birth missing (living people)
Papua New Guinean women
Papua New Guinean climate activists
People from Morobe Province
Papua New Guinean environmentalists
Papua New Guinea University of Technology alumni
Living people